Sir Guy Anstruther Knox Marshall FRS (20 December 1871 in Amritsar, Punjab – 8 April 1959 in London), was an Indian-born British entomologist. He was an expert on African and oriental weevils.

Early life
Marshall was the youngest of three children born to Laura Frances Pollock (1846–1912), daughter of Sir Frederick Pollock, 1st Baronet and Chief Baron of the Exchequer, and Colonel Charles Henry Tilson Marshall (1841–1927), a district judge. Both Guy's father and his uncle, Major-General George Frederick Leycester Marshall (1843–1934), were naturalists who had produced books on the birds and butterflies of India, Burma, and Ceylon.

Marshall was sent from India to a school in Margate where he started a butterfly collection. He transferred his attentions to beetles when he enrolled at Charterhouse. When he failed the Indian Civil Service entrance examination, his father shipped him off to Natal in South Africa to learn sheep farming. He ended up in Rhodesia, managing the Salisbury District and Estates Company and owning two farms, one managed by Charles Francis Massy Swynnerton.

Career and correspondences 
Marshall corresponded with the prominent Darwinian, Edward Bagnall Poulton, Hope Professor of Zoology at Oxford University who had written The Colours of Animals (1890). Poulton urged Marshall to study insect colours in mimicry and camouflage. Throughout this research project Marshall put together a collection of plant specimens from southern Africa. His findings were published as a joint paper in Transactions of the Entomological Society of London in 1902.

Poulton later helped Marshall in obtaining an appointment at Sarawak Museum. Marshall, however, became ill during a stay-over in London. When some of his papers on weevils were published, he was offered an appointment as scientific secretary to the Entomological Research Committee (Tropical Africa). The committee's function was to post field entomologists to East and West Africa who would study insects harmful to humans, crops and animals and send specimens to the Natural History Museum in London for identification. Under Marshall's management the Committee grew into a powerful and efficient body. Eventually all the agricultural information services were merged as the Commonwealth Agricultural Bureaux (CAB). Marshall established the biological control service at Farnham House, giving rise to a global network of laboratories and creating two scientific publications: the Bulletin of Entomological Research and the Review of Applied Entomology.

Marshall's organisation took on the enormous task of writing up the ‘Insecta’ division of The Zoological Record. In 1916 he received an honorary doctorate from the University of Oxford for his contribution to economic entomology. He was elected Honorary Fellow of the Royal Entomological Society of London

Honors
Marshall received many honors – he was elected to the Royal Society, the American Academy of Arts and Sciences, the Royal Society of New Zealand, the Indian Institute of Science, the Royal Belgian Entomological Society, and the Russian Entomological Society.

Marshall's identification work at the institute led to his extensive knowledge of insect taxonomy. His specialising in the Curculionidae was by accident rather than design, as they were the only group left intact after a trip to England in 1896. In total he wrote up some 2300 new species in some 200 papers. After his retirement the Natural History Museum set aside office space for his taxonomic work, with which he continued until shortly before his death.

A species of African dwarf chameleon, Rhampholeon marshalli, is named in his honor.

Bibliography 
Among the publications of Marshall are:
  (volume of The Fauna of British India, Including Ceylon and Burma, ed. A.E. Shipley).

References

1871 births
1959 deaths
People educated at Charterhouse School
British entomologists
Fellows of the Royal Society
Knights Commander of the Order of St Michael and St George
Coleopterists